The Gaziantep Polis Gücü Hockey is a Turkish men's field hockey side of Gaziantep Polis Gücü SK based in Gaziantep, Turkey. Founded in 2003, it is sponsored by the Gaziantep Police Directorate. The team plays in the Turkish Field Hockey Men's Super League and Turkish Indoor Hockey Men's Super League. It is coached by Yusuf Kasım.

As of May 2013, the hockey side has a total of 112 sportspeople consisting of 16 boys in the U12-age category, 18 boys in the U14, 22 boys in the U16, 20 boys in the youth (U18), 18 juniors (U21) and 18 senior players. 32 players of the team were admitted to the Turkey national teams sofar.

Between 2003 and 2013, the Gaziantep Polis Gücü Hockey team became twelve times Turkish champion, four times Turkish championship runner-up, and ranked three times on place third. The club's junior team won the 2012 Turkish Indoor Championships in Aksaray, and the senior team became Turkish field hockey champion held in Zonguldak the same year. They won also the 2012-13 Turkish Indoor Super League held on January 30-February 3, 2013 in Mengen, Bolu Province.

In 2008, Gaziantep Polis Gücü played at the Eurohockey Men’s Club Champions Challenge IV held on May 8–11 in Moravske Toplice, Slovenia, and placed third. The team qualified for the participation at the 2013 Eurohockey Men’s Club Champions Challenge III held on May 17–20 in Bratislava, Slovakia. They became champion of the division defeating the teams from Finland, Denmark and Bulgaria. The team is promoted to one higher division for the next year's championship. Team member Orhun Özel scored 10 of the total 28 goals in four games, and was named Top Scorer of the tournament.

References

Gaziantep Polis Gücü SK
Field hockey clubs established in 2003
2003 establishments in Turkey
Turkish field hockey clubs